Nagybánhegyes is a village in Békés County, in the Southern Great Plain region of south-east Hungary.

Geography
It covers an area of 42.26 km² and has a population of 1224 people (2015).

Other information
Nagybánhegyes is also the place where the mass-production of the Hungarian product, Pöttyös Túri Rudi was started in 1981.

References

See also
 Magyar-Bánhegyes ("Hungarian Bánhegyes")

Populated places in Békés County
Slovak communities in Hungary